Raissonable is the name of some warships:

 , a French Navy 64-gun ship of the line, captured by the British in 1758 and renamed HMS Raisonabble
 , a Royal Navy 64-gun ship of the line

Ship names